Verneix is a commune in the Allier department in Auvergne-Rhône-Alpes in central France.

Population

Sights
Saint Laurent church from the 19th century.

Personalities
Théophile Alajouanine, (1890–1980), neurologist and writer, born in Verneix

See also
Communes of the Allier department

References

Communes of Allier